Porthall railway station served Porthall, County Donegal in the Republic of Ireland.

The Londonderry and Enniskillen Railway opened the station on 1 May 1848. It was taken over by the Great Northern Railway (Ireland) in 1883.

It closed on 15 February 1965.

Routes

References

Disused railway stations in County Donegal
Railway stations opened in 1848
Railway stations closed in 1965
1848 establishments in England
1965 disestablishments in England
Railway stations in the Republic of Ireland opened in 1848
Railway stations in Northern Ireland opened in the 19th century